The Alice's Garden is a garden in Fenyuan Township, Changhua County, Taiwan.

Architecture
The garden has various themes, with Lychee as their main theme, the special farm produce of Fenyuan. There are 22 Lychee figurines installed around the garden. There are floral fragrance, hearts and arrows, Alice's wonderland, smile of princess, laughter machine, Lychee baby, dream station etc. The garden also features a restaurant and Lychee queen gift shop.

See also
 List of tourist attractions in Taiwan

References

External links

  

Gardens in Taiwan
Geography of Changhua County
Tourist attractions in Changhua County